The East Walker River Petroglyph Site, near Yerington, Nevada, United States, is a  archeological site that was listed on the National Register of Historic Places in 1980.

The location is not disclosed by the National Register, which describes it as "Address Restricted".  However a local archeological club mentions a petroglyph site on the East Walker River that is located "on Barron Hilton's Flying M Ranch", which is likely the same, and describes that it is located about 45 minutes south of Yerington.

Environmental impacts for the National Register-listed district were considered in a 1984 Bureau of Land Management study, a regional planning document.

References 

Archaeological sites on the National Register of Historic Places in Nevada
Lyon County, Nevada
National Register of Historic Places in Lyon County, Nevada